Lee Anne Wong is an American chef, restauranteur, a television culinary producer, and television figure. She has appeared as a competitor on reality television cooking competitions, and she is a Top Chef television series alum. Wong was based in New York City, before moving to Hawaii in 2013. She has also worked extensively as a culinary producer for American television series, including for four seasons of Top Chef.

Early life and education 
Lee Anne Wong grew up in Wynantskill, New York, a small town in Rensselaer County outside Albany.

She began her college education at the Fashion Institute of Technology, where she studied fashion design, but later transferred to the professional cooking program at The French Culinary Institute (now the International Culinary Center).

Career 
Later she became the Executive Chef of Event Operations at The French Culinary Institute, a position she maintained while participating in the Top Chef competitions. 

From 2010 until 2013, she has also be seen on the Cooking Channel's Unique Eats as a commentator. She was also the chef consultant for the 2007 American remake of the German film, Mostly Martha, called No Reservations.

Wong participated in a tasting benefit event produced by New York Loves Japan and Project by Project to fundraise for the 2011 Japan earthquake aid relief. In 2011, Wong appeared on Iron Chef America (season 10, episode 1), with Halloween candy being the secret ingredient; chef Wong successfully challenged Iron Chef Marc Forgione with a resulting score of 52–51.

Wong moved to Honolulu, Hawaiʻi, in 2013, followed by a brief move to Maui. In 2014, she opened and continued to run Koko Head Cafe, a popular brunch spot. Wong also joined the Hawaiian Airlines culinary team in 2015 and became executive chef in 2018.

She was one of the last four contestants on the 2006 first season of Bravo's reality show, Top Chef. She was the culinary producer for the next four seasons of Top Chef, where her duties included sourcing and styling the ingredients for the various challenges, as well as determining the budget, equipment restrictions and time limits. She also blogged about the show for Bravo, and hosted the webcast Top Recipe: The Wong Way to Cook, in which she demonstrated how to prepare various winning dishes invented by the program contestants.

In 2018, Wong competed on Top Chef: Colorado, winning a spot on the season proper through its Last Chance Kitchen feature.  She withdrew during her second week of the competition due to altitude sickness combined with her pregnancy. In 2020, Wong competed on Top Chef: All-Stars L.A. and made it to Episode 9 before being eliminated.

Filmography 

 2006, Top Chef: San Francisco, as self and contestant
 2010–2013, Unique Eats, as self and host
 2011, Iron Chef America: The Series, as self and contestant, in "Forgione vs. Wong: Halloween Candy" (season 10, episode 16)
 2012–2015, Chopped, as self and judge
 2017, Top Chef: Colorado, as self and contestant
 2020, Top Chef: All-Stars L.A., as self and contestant
 2023, Tournament of Champions, as self and contestant

Notes

External links 
 

Living people
Year of birth missing (living people)
Top Chef contestants
American chefs
American women chefs
Asian American chefs
American people of Chinese descent
Fashion Institute of Technology alumni
International Culinary Center alumni
American television chefs
Chefs from New York City
People from Rensselaer County, New York
People from Honolulu